The  is one of nine active divisions of the Japan Ground Self-Defense Force. The division has been subordinated to the North Eastern Army and is headquartered in at JGSDF Camp Jinmachi located in Higashine, Yamagata Prefecture in northern Japan. Its responsibility is the defense of Fukushima, Miyagi and Yamagata prefectures.

The division was raised on 15 August 1962. The division contributed 500 troops to the Japanese Iraq Reconstruction and Support Group under the United Nations in 2004.

Organization 

 6th Division, in Higashine
 6th Division HQ, in Higashine
 20th Infantry Regiment note 1, in Higashine, with four infantry and one heavy mortar company
 22nd Rapid Deployment Regiment, in Tagajō, with 1x headquarters, three Type 96 armored personnel carrier, 1x 120mm F1 mortar, and 1x Type 16 maneuver combat vehicle company
 44th Infantry Regiment, in Fukushima, with four infantry and one heavy mortar company
 6th Anti-Aircraft Artillery Battalion, in Kōriyama, with a Type 81 and a Type 93 Surface-to-air missile squadron
 6th Engineer Battalion (Combat), in Higashine
 6th Signal Battalion, in Higashine
 6th Reconnaissance Company, in Taiwa, with Type 87 armored reconnaissance vehicles
 6th Aviation Squadron, at Yamagata Airport, flying UH-1J and OH-6D helicopters
 6th NBC Protection Company, in Higashine
 6th Logistic Support Regiment, in Higashine
 1st Maintenance Battalion
 2nd Maintenance Battalion
 Supply Company
 Medical Company
 Transport Company
 6th Intelligence Unit

note 1: Infantry Regiments have only battalion strength.

External links
 Homepage 6th Division (Japanese)

Japan Ground Self-Defense Force Division
Military units and formations established in 1962